The Carji Greeves  Medal  is a name given in recent decades to an Australian rules football award given to the player(s) adjudged best and fairest for the Geelong Football Club for the season. 

The voting system has changed a number of times. For the 2017 AFL season, the voting panel consisted of the senior coach, director of coaching and the assistant coaches rating each player out of 15 after every game. The combined votes are averaged to give a final score for that game. To ensure players are not disadvantaged by injury, only a player's highest scoring 21 games count.

For the 2022 AFL season, after each game, the Senior and assistant coaches reviewed and rated each players performance out of 10. Votes were polled in games where a players performance had been deemed of a high quality by the coaching group, and unlike previous seasons all matches counted towards their final total.

Edward 'Carji' Greeves was a champion Geelong footballer who won the inaugural Brownlow Medal in 1924, for the best and fairest player in the Victorian Football League.

Recipients

Multiple winners

Notes

 The Geelong Football Club did not participate in the 1916 VFL season because of World War I.
 The award was known at the time as the Theo Lewis Cup.
 The Geelong Football Club did not participate in the 1942 and 1943 VFL seasons because of World War II.

References
General

Specific

External links
Official AFL Website of the Geelong Cats

 
Australian Football League awards
Lists of Geelong Football Club players